Hamid Reza Abrarinia (born 29 September 1978 ) is an Iranian professional futsal coach and former player. He is currently goalkeeping coach of Giti Pasand in the Iranian Futsal Super League.

Honours

Country 
 AFC Futsal Championship
 Champions (6): 2002 - 2003 - 2004 - 2005 - 2008 - 2010

Club 
 AFC Futsal Club Championship
 Champion (1): 2010 (Foolad Mahan)
 Iranian Futsal Super League
 Champion (3): 2008–09 (Foolad Mahan) - 2009–10 (Foolad Mahan) - 2013–14 (Dabiri)

References

External links 
 
 

1978 births
Living people
Iranian men's futsal players
Futsal goalkeepers
Sadra Shiraz FSC players
Foolad Mahan FSC players